Angry young man or angry young men may refer to:

British New Wave, or the Angry Young Man genre, a British film genre of the 1960s
Angry young men, a journalistic catchphrase applied to some British writers of the mid-1950s
Fenqing, a Chinese slang term for young nationalists, literal translation "angry young men"
"Prelude/Angry Young Man", a 1976 song/single by Billy Joel
"Fooling Yourself (The Angry Young Man)", a song by Styx
"The World is Full of Angry Young Men", a song by English rock band XTC on the 1990 album Rag and Bone Buffet: Rare Cuts and Leftovers
Amitabh Bachchan, Hindi film actor, dubbed "Angry Young Man" in journalism
Angry young man (South Korea)

See also
Young Turks (disambiguation)
Angry white male